The R684 road is a regional road in County Waterford, Ireland. It runs near Waterford City, linking the junction with the R683 at Blenheim Cross to the village of Dunmore East. 

The road travels via Callaghane Bridge, Kilmacomb, where it meets the R685, and terminates at Dock Road in Dunmore East. In addition to the section of the R683 linking Waterford city to the junction at Blenheim Cross, the R684 is known as Dunmore Road.

See also
Roads in Ireland

References
Roads Act 1993 (Classification of Regional Roads) Order 2006 – Department of Transport

Regional roads in the Republic of Ireland
Roads in County Waterford